Maei Subtownship is divided from Toungup Township, Rakhine State, Myanmar. There are two Sub-Tsps at Thandwe District, Maei Subtownship in Toungup and Kyeintali Subtownship in Gwa. Government offices of Maei Subtownship are located in Toungup.

References

Populated places in Rakhine State